Osor is a municipality in the comarca of la Selva in Catalonia, Spain.

Main Sights 
 Pont Vell, 15th century bridge
 Sant Pere d'Osor church

References

External links 

 Official website 
 Government data pages 

Municipalities in Selva